Carl Johan Alexis Enckell (7 June 1876 – 26 March 1959) was a Finnish politician, diplomat, officer and businessman.

Enckell followed his father's footsteps in the Russian military and rose to the Imperial Russian Guard. As he was not satisfied with the salary and his stagnated military career, he studied mechanical engineering in Germany. After graduation in 1903, he worked in the Kuusankoski paper mill and the Helsinki-based engineering companies Hietalahti Shipyard and Engineering Works and Kone- ja Siltarakennus. During the 1910s Enckell was also active in a number of employers' organisations.

In 1917, shortly before the October Revolution, Enckell was appointed Finnish Minister–Secretary of State to Saint Petersburg. Following the Finnish Declaration of Independence, Enckell worked hard to get international recognition for the declaration. During the following years, Enckell served as Finnish envoy to Paris, and later to the League of Nations, in which he successfully pursued the Finnish interests in the Åland crisis. He also served as foreign minister in four short-lived cabinets during the early politically turbulent years of the young republic.

Enckell moved back to work in the financial sector in the 1920s but made a return to politics as Foreign Minister in 1944. He led Finland out from Second World War and contributed to establishing friendly relations with the Soviet Union and the new Finnish foreign policy, the Paasikivi–Kekkonen doctrine.

Enckell was married to German-born Lucy Ponsonby-Lyons. They had four children, of whom Ralph Enckell became a notable diplomat.

Early years and military studies 
Carl Enckell was born and spent his first seven years in Saint Petersburg. His father, Carl Enckell Sr., served as a military officer until he returned to the Grand Duchy of Finland after serving for 30 years in the Imperial Russian Army. As a son of a military family, Enckell went to study in Hamina Cadet School which was at the time managed by his father. He graduated in 1896 as ensign and best of his class. Enckell was positioned in Izmaylovsky Regiment, Imperial Russian Guard.

Engineering studies and business career 
Salaries in the military had stayed behind the business and industry, and in 1899 Enckell begun engineering studies in Dresden University of Technology, in Germany. After three years of studies he graduated as Mechanical Engineer and returned to Finland with his German wife Lucy Ponsonby-Lyons.

During 1903–1905 Enckell worked in the Kuusankoski paper mill as supervisor and chief engineer. In 1905 he moved to Helsinki and started working for the Hietalahti Shipyard and Engineering Works, where he stayed until he got a deputy director position in Kone- ja Siltarakennus in 1907. In 1911 he was appointed managing director of the company.

Enckell aimed to keep production in balance in the turbulent market, as the Finnish engineering industry faced both up- and downswings. Enckell could gather beneficial orders for military supplies during the Russo-Japanese War and the following armaments race prior to First World War.

Employers' organisations 
During the 1910s Enckell operated in employers' organisations; during 1912–1919 he was deputy director of Finnish General Employers' Federation and Finnish Engineering Industry Employers' Federation. He took part in economical and political negotiations between the Grand Duchy of Finland and the Russian Empire in 1913–1915; he represented the Finnish industry and resisted the suggested Russian uniform tariff policy which would have weakened the competitiveness of Finnish companies against Russian ones.

Beginning of political career 
Enckell became involved in local politics during 1911–1914 in Helsinki City Council. In 1917 he was appointed Finnish Minister–Secretary of State to Saint Petersburg. Following the Bolshevik Revolution, the Finnish senate declared itself the highest authority in Finland. As a representative of the Senate, Enckell worked hard to persuade foreign governments and the Bolshevik leadership to support the Finnish pursuit of independence. On 6 December 1917 the senate declared Finland a sovereign country. A Finnish delegation, which comprised Enckell, Gustaf Idman and Regent of Finland Pehr Evind Svinhufvud, visited the Bolshevik government. Secretary General of the Council of People's Commissars Vladimir Bonch-Bruyevich announced to the Finnish delegation that the Council recognised the Finnish independence; the confirmation by the central committee followed four days later. After this followed the recognitions of France, Germany and the Scandinavian countries.

Enckell was one of the few Finnish politicians who had experience in foreign relations; during the first years of independence he was Minister of Foreign affairs in Lauri Ingman's cabinet 1918–1919 after which he was appointed Finnish Representative to Paris. In the peace negotiations that followed the First World War, Finland took distance from Germany to get recognition for its independence from the Allies. Finland also sought for support in the Åland crisis that had emerged with Sweden, which demanded the group of islands to itself. Enckell led the Finnish delegation in peace negotiations in Paris in 1919. League of Nations processed the position of Åland in 1920–1921; Enckell purposefully slowed down the negotiations to ensure that Finnish membership to the League was secured before the issue was resolved by the League of Nations. In 1921 the League of Nations resolved the dispute in favour of Finland, largely due to Enckell's diplomatic endeavours. After managing complicated political questions successfully in Saint Petersburg, Paris and the League of Nations, Enckell became reputable for his excellent diplomatic skills.

Enckell returned as Foreign Minister in two short-living cabinets led by Aimo Cajander in 1922 and 1924.

Career in financial sector 
Enckell left politics for banking in 1927, when he became deputy director of Liittopankki. After a merger with Helsingin Osakepankki (HOP) in 1931, he became a board member in HOP. In 1936 Enckell became the managing director of Industrialists' Mutual Fire Insurance Company. Enckell took part again in activities in employers' organisations and worked in positions of trust in a number of Finnish companies.

Back to politics 
Enckell returned to politics in September 1944 when he was appointed Minister of Foreign Affairs in Antti Hackzell's cabinet. He was sent to peace negotiations to Moscow to replace the head of the Finnish delegation, prime minister Hackzell, who had fallen seriously ill. As an outcome, Finland signed the Moscow Armistice which ended the Continuation War between Finland and Soviet Union. Enckell took part in the Paris peace conference in August and September 1946 as deputy chairman of the Finnish delegation and on 10 February 1947 he signed the Paris peace treaty as chairman of the delegation.

Enckell left his post as insurance company director in 1946 and devoted again to foreign affairs. After the Second World War, he took part in structuring a new pragmatic role for Finland in the global politics. The policy, later known as Paasikivi–Kekkonen doctrine, was based on the geopolitic fact that Finland was a neighbour to a superpower and did not have powerful allies. In 1948 Enckell took part in negotiations with the Soviet Union, after which the countries signed the Agreement of Friendship, Cooperation, and Mutual Assistance, that became a cornerstone for the Finnish foreign policy until the early 1990s.

Enckell retired in March 1950, after serving as Foreign Minister for six consecutive years. During his career he served a grand total of 2,502 days as foreign minister.

Personal life 
In 1903 Enckell was married to German-born Lucy Marie Frieda Agathe Margareta Ponsonby-Lyons (1875–1945). The couple had two daughters and two sons who were born between 1911–1920. The younger son, Ralph Enckell, became a notable diplomat.

Enckell bought Eriksnäs Mansion in Sipoo in 1916 and used it as his summer residence. During his diplomacy years in Paris he started collecting historical maps of Northern Europe and Russia; the collection is currently kept in Helsinki University Library.

Board memberships 
 Finnish General Employers' Federation 
 Finnish Engineering Industry Employers' Federation 
 Domestic Work Association 
 Helsingin Osakepankki (1931–1936)
 Industrialists' Mutual Fire Insurance Company (1936–1946) 
 Oy Aga Ab (1939–)
 Wärtsilä Group (1945–1949)

Awards 
 Cross of Liberty, 1st Class (1919)
 Commander of the White Rose of Finland, 1st class (1919)
 Grand Cross of the White Rose of Finland (1921)
 Cross of Liberty, 1st Class with a grand star (1944)
 Grand Cross of the White Rose of Finland with Collar (1946)
 Grand Cross of the Dannebrog (Denmark; 1919)
 Grand Cross of Vasa (Sweden; 1919)
 Commander of the Legion of Honour, (France; 1920)
 Cross of Liberty, 1st Class (Estonia; 1922)
 Grand Cross of the Crown of Belgium (Belgium; 1924)
 Grand Officer of the Legion of Honour, (France; 1926)
 Grand Cross of the Falcon of Iceland (Iceland; 1949)
 Grand Cross of Polonia Restituta (Poland; 1927)

References

Further reading 

 
 

1876 births
1959 deaths
Burials at Hietaniemi Cemetery
Finnish people of German descent
Ministers for Foreign Affairs of Finland
Permanent Representatives of Finland to the League of Nations
Kone- ja Siltarakennus
Finnish bankers
World War II political leaders